The Pool of the 2005 Fed Cup Americas Zone Group II composed of four teams competing in a round robin competition. The top two teams qualified for Group I next year.

Colombia vs. Venezuela

Chile vs. Dominican Republic

Colombia vs. Chile

Venezuela vs. Dominican Republic

Colombia vs. Dominican Republic

Chile vs. Venezuela

  and  advanced to Group I for next year, where they both placed equal fifth.

See also
Fed Cup structure

References

External links
 Fed Cup website

2005 Fed Cup Americas Zone